Cuibul de viespi is a 1986 Romanian comedy film directed by Horea Popescu.

Cast 
 Ovidiu Iuliu Moldovan - Mircea Aldea
 Coca Andronescu - Zoia
 Tamara Buciuceanu - Aneta Duduleanu
 Gheorghe Dinică - Georges
 Tora Vasilescu - Collette
 Alexandru Repan - Al. Popescu
 Maria Ploae - Margareta Aldea
  - Cioclu 1
 Mircea Albulescu - Om necajit
 George Constantin - Oncle Michel
 Marin Moraru - Ianache Duduleanu
 Ion Cojar - Valeriu
 Theodor Danetti - Antreprenor pompe funebre

References

External links 

1986 comedy films
1986 films
Romanian comedy films